East European Comic Con
 European Electronic Communications Code